is a song by Japanese recording artist Misia. It was released as a digital single on November 22, 2005 and was used in Biore by Kao commercials. The song was written by Misia while the composition and production were handled by singer-songwriter Joi. A 12" single including remixes by Joe Claussell was released on December 21, 2005.

Track listing

References 

2005 songs
Misia songs
Songs written by Misia